In Greek mythology, Ino was a Theban princess who later became a queen of Boeotia. After her death and transfiguration, she was worshiped as a goddess under her epithet Leucothea, the "white goddess." Alcman called her "Queen of the Sea" ( thalassomédousa), which, if not hyperbole, would make her a doublet of Amphitrite.

Family 

Ino was the second daughter of the King Cadmus and Queen Harmonia of Thebes and one of the three sisters of Semele, the mortal woman of the house of Cadmus who gave birth to Dionysus. Her only brother was Polydorus, another ruler of Thebes. Together with her two sisters, Agave and Autonoë, they were the surrogates and divine nurses of Dionysus:Ino was a primordial Dionysian woman, nurse to the god and a divine maenad. (Kerenyi 1976:246)Ino was the second wife of the Minyan king Athamas, mother of Learchus and Melicertes and stepmother of Phrixus and Helle.

Mythology 
Maenads were reputed to tear their own children limb from limb in their madness. In the back-story to the heroic tale of Jason and the Golden Fleece, Phrixus and Helle, twin children of Athamas and Nephele, were hated by their stepmother, Ino. Ino hatched a devious plot to get rid of the twins, roasting all the crop seeds of Boeotia so they would not grow. The local farmers, frightened of famine, asked a nearby oracle for assistance. Ino bribed the men sent to the oracle to lie and tell the others that the oracle required the sacrifice of Phrixus. Athamas reluctantly agreed. Before he was killed though, Phrixus and Helle were rescued by a flying golden ram sent by Nephele, their natural mother. Helle fell off the ram into the Hellespont (which was named after her, meaning Sea of Helle) and drowned, but Phrixus survived all the way to Colchis, where King Aeetes took him in and treated him kindly, giving Phrixus his daughter, Chalciope, in marriage. In gratitude, Phrixus gave the king the golden fleece of the ram, which Aeetes hung in a tree in his kingdom.

Later, Ino raised Dionysus, her nephew, son of her sister Semele, causing Hera's intense jealousy. In vengeance, Hera struck Athamas with insanity. Athamas went mad, slew one of his sons, Learchus,  hunting him down like a stag, and set out in frenzied pursuit of Ino. To escape him Ino threw herself into the sea with her son Melicertes. Both were afterwards worshipped as marine divinities, Ino as Leucothea ("the white goddess"), Melicertes as Palaemon.  Alternatively, Ino was also stricken with insanity and killed Melicertes by boiling him in a cauldron, then jumped into the sea with her dead son.  A sympathetic Zeus did not want Ino to die, and transfigured her and Melicertes as Leucothea and Palaemon.

The story of Ino, Athamas and Melicertes is relevant also in the context of two larger themes.  Ino, daughter of Cadmus and Harmonia, had an end just as tragic as her siblings: Semele died while pregnant with Zeus' child, killed by her own pride and lack of trust in her lover; Agave killed her own son, King Pentheus, while struck with Dionysian madness, and Actaeon, son of Autonoe, the third sibling, was torn apart by his own hunting dogs.  Also, the insanity of Ino and Athamas, who hunted his own son Learchus as a stag and slew him, can be explained as a result of their contact with Dionysus, whose presence can cause insanity.  None can escape the powers of Dionysus, the god of wine. Euripides took up the tale in The Bacchae, explaining their madness in Dionysiac terms, as a result of their having initially resisted belief in the god's divinity.

After Ino's disappearance, some of her companions began to revile Hera, so the goddess turned them into birds according to Ovid, perhaps aithuia birds (shearwaters?).

When Athamas returned to his second wife, Ino, Themisto (his third wife) sought revenge by dressing her children in white clothing and Ino's in black and directing the murder of the children in black. Ino switched their clothes without Themisto knowing and she killed her own children.

Transformed into the goddess Leucothea, Ino also represents one of the many sources of divine aid to Odysseus in the Odyssey (5:333ff), her earliest appearance in literature. Homer calls her "Ino-Leocothea of the beautiful ankles [καλλίσφυρος], daughter of Cadmus, who was once a mortal speaking with the tongue of men, but now in the salt sea-waters has received honor at the hands of the gods". Providing Odysseus with a veil and telling him to discard his cloak and raft, she instructs him how he can entrust himself to the waves and succeed in reaching land and eventually the island of Scheria (Corcyra), home of Phaeaceans.

In historical times, a sisterhood of maenads of Thebes in the service of Dionysus traced their descent in the female line from Ino; we know this because an inscription at Magnesia on the Maeander summoned three maenads from Thebes, from the house of Ino, to direct the new mysteries of Dionysus at Magnesia (Burkert 1992:44).

Festivals 
Inoa (Ἰνῶα), there were festivals which were celebrated in many different places in honour of Ino.

Genealogy

Gallery

Notes

References
Apollodorus, The Library with an English Translation by Sir James George Frazer, F.B.A., F.R.S. in 2 Volumes, Cambridge, MA, Harvard University Press; London, William Heinemann Ltd. 1921. ISBN 0-674-99135-4. Online version at the Perseus Digital Library. Greek text available from the same website.
 (US ) pp. 36–42, 151
Burkert, Walter, 1992. The Orientalizing Revolution: Near Eastern Influence on Greek Culture in the Early Archaic Age  (Cambridge:Harvard University Press).
Hesiod, Theogony from The Homeric Hymns and Homerica with an English Translation by Hugh G. Evelyn-White, Cambridge, MA.,Harvard University Press; London, William Heinemann Ltd. 1914. Online version at the Perseus Digital Library. Greek text available from the same website.
Kerenyi, Karl, 1976. Dionysus: Archetypal Image of Indestructible Life (Princeton: Bollingen).
Kerenyi, Karl, 1951. The Gods of the Greeks (Thames and Hudson).

External links 
 

Greek goddesses
Family of Athamas
Princesses in Greek mythology
Queens in Greek mythology
Metamorphoses characters
Metamorphoses in Greek mythology
Deeds of Hera
Theban characters in Greek mythology
Boeotian mythology
Theban mythology
Dionysus in mythology
Suicides in Greek mythology
Ino's companions